The following is a list of notable deaths in July 2003.

Entries for each day are listed alphabetically by surname. A typical entry lists information in the following sequence:
 Name, age, country of citizenship at birth, subsequent country of citizenship (if applicable), reason for notability, cause of death (if known), and reference.

July 2003

1
John Bissell Carroll, 87, American psychologist.
Herbie Mann, 73, American crossover jazz and bossa nova flutist.
Bill Miller, 75, American baseball player (New York Yankees, Baltimore Orioles).
Wesley Mouzon, 75, American professional boxer, beat Bob Montgomery.
N!xau, 58, Namibian actor and bushman (The Gods Must Be Crazy).
George Roper, 69, English comedian.

2
Ivan Allen Jr., 92, American businessman and 52nd mayor of Atlanta.
Franklin Farrell, 95, American ice hockey player (silver medal in men's ice hockey at the 1932 Winter Olympics).
Antonio Fortich, 89, Catholic bishop and social activist.
Najeeb Halaby, 87, American businessman, aviator, and the father of Queen Noor of Jordan.
Julia Montgomery Walsh, 80, American businesswoman and stockbroker.

3
Gaetano Alibrandi, 89, Italian papal diplomat and Apostolic Nuncio to the Republic of Ireland.
Harold Creighton, 75, British businessman and magazine editor.
Vince Lloyd, 96, American radio announcer.
Sir Charles Tidbury, 77, British brewing executive.
C. C. Wang, 96, Chinese-American artist and art collector.

4
Manuel Araneta Jr., 76, Filipino basketball player (basketball at the 1948 Summer Olympics).
Larry Burkett, 64, American radio personality, heart failure.
Anthony J. Celebrezze Jr., 61, American politician, heart attack.
André Claveau, 87, French singer.
Tyler McVey, 91, American actor.
Barry White, 58, American smooth soul singer ("Can't Get Enough of Your Love, Babe"), renal failure.

5
George Ibrahim, 38, Pakistani Roman Catholic priest.
Isabelle, Countess of Paris, 91, widow of Henri, Count of Paris, pretender to the French throne.
Roman Lyashenko, 24, Russian ice hockey player (Dallas Stars, New York Rangers), suicide.
Yoshio Sakurauchi, 91, Japanese politician.
Bebu Silvetti, 59, Argentine musician, songwriter and arranger.
Zhang Aiping, 93, Chinese military leader, defense minister under Deng Xiaoping, managed China's nuclear bomb program.

6
Skip Battin, 69, American bass guitarist, singer and songwriter, member of The Byrds, the Flying Burrito Brothers.
Ed Chandler, 86, American baseball player (Brooklyn Dodgers).
Buddy Ebsen, 95, American actor (The Beverly Hillbillies, Barnaby Jones, Breakfast at Tiffany's).
Michael Hoban, 81, British headmaster.
Ćiril Kos, 83, Croatian Roman Catholic prelate, Bishop of Djakovo or Bosna and Srijem (1974–1997)
Kathleen Raine, 95, British poet and literary critic.
Spec Sanders, 84, American football player (University of Texas, New York Yankees, New York Yanks).
Ignacio Velasco, 74, Venezuelan Roman Catholic cardinal, Archbishop of Caracas from 1995 to 2003.

7
Raphael I Bidawid, 81, Iraqi Patriarch of the Chaldean Catholic Church from 1989 to 2003.
Warren L. Carpenter, 71, American military surgeon.
Lee Francis, 58, Native American poet, and educator, cancer.
Izhak Graziani, 78, conductor.
Antonio Iranzo, 73, Spanish film actor.
Charles P. Kindleberger, 92, American economic historian and author, stroke.
Ribs Raney, 80, American baseball player (St. Louis Browns).
Bob Rose, 74, Australian rules footballer and coach, cancer.

8
Ladan and Laleh Bijani, 29, Iranian conjoined twins, complications following separation surgery.
Paul Brand, 88, British surgeon, pioneering leprosy research.
Duncan Clark, 88, Scottish hammer thrower (1948 Olympic men's hammer throw, 1952 Olympic men's hammer throw).
Lewis A. Coser, 89, German-American sociologist.
Angelamaría Dávila, 59, Puerto Rican poet and writer, lung complications from Alzheimer's disease.
Subhash Mukhopadhyay, 84, Indian Bengali poets.

9
Christopher Black Sr., 43, American convicted murderer, execution by lethal injection.
Eberhard Blum, 84, German civil servant, head of the German Federal Intelligence Bureau (BND).
Joe Cobbold, 76, English greyhound trainer.
Valerie Gearon, 65, British actress.
Josephine Jacobsen, 94, American poet, short story writer and essayist.
Riley Dobi Noel, 31, American convicted murderer, execution by lethal injection.
Gregg Wenzel, 33, American Directorate of Operations officer for the CIA stationed in Ethiopia, traffic accident.

10
Alvin Alcorn, 90, American New Orleans jazz trumpeter.
Winston Graham, 95, English novelist.
John Purdell, 44, American musician and record producer, cancer.
Hartley Shawcross, Baron Shawcross, 101, Britain's chief prosecutor at the Nuremberg Trials.
Manuel Vasques, 76, Portuguese footballer.

11
Mickey Deans, 68, American discoteque manager and (last) husband of actress and singer Judy Garland.
Zahra Kazemi, 55, Iran-born Canadian journalist, death by torture.
Dorothy Canning Miller, 99, American art curator.
Robert Gascoyne-Cecil, 6th Marquess of Salisbury, 86, British aristocrat and politician.
Ray Whitrod, 88, Australian police officer and Queensland Police Commissioner.
Ken Whyld, 77, British chess author (The Oxford Companion to Chess), historian and columnist.
Teddy Yip, 96, Indonesian businessman and race car driver and team owner (Formula One, IndyCar).

12
Benny Carter, 95, American jazz pioneer.
Patricia Courtney, 71, American baseball player (AAGPBL)
Roger Freeman, 51, British rally driver, motor race accident.
Mark Lovell, 43, British rally driver, motor race accident.
Eliot Wald, 57, American comedy writer for theater, television and movies (The Second City, Saturday Night Live, Camp Nowhere).

13
Alpha L. Bowser, 92, American U.S. Marine Corps lieutenant general (Battle of Iwo Jima, Battle of Chosin Reservoir).
Kadawedduwe Jinavamsa Mahathera, 96, Sri Lankan Buddhist monk.
Jim Quinlan, 81, American professional basketball player (Rochester Royals).
Eileen Rodgers, 73, American singer and Broadway performer, lung cancer.
Compay Segundo, 95, Cuban musician and star of the Buena Vista Social Club, kidney failure.

14
K Bhogishayana, 77, Indian educator.
Leela Chitnis, 93, Indian actress.
Morrissey Johnson, 70, Canadian politician (MP for Bonavista—Trinity—Conception, NL), motor vehicle collision with a moose.
Rubén Marino Navarro, 70, Argentine football player.
Louis Robertshaw, 90, American football player and lieutenant general in the US Marine Corps, cancer.
Olavi Saikku, 94, Finnish diplomat.
John Scholes, 53, Australian cricketer and coach, heart attack.
Rajendra Singh, 81, fourth head of the Rashtriya Swayamsevak Sangh (RSS).

15
Roberto Bolaño, 50, Chilean-Spanish writer (The Savage Detectives, 2666), liver failure.
John Richard Hyde, 90, Canadian soldier and politician.
Judith Hare, Countess of Listowel, 100, Hungarian-born British writer and aristocrat.
Tex Schramm, 83, American president and general manager of the Dallas Cowboys professional football team.
Alexander Walker, 73, Northern Irish film critic (London Evening Standard) and author.
Elisabeth Welch, 99, American singer and actress.

16
Alida van den Bos, 101, Dutch gymnast (gold medal in women's team gymnastics at the 1928 Summer Olympics).
Celia Cruz, 77, Cuban salsa singer.
Captain James Kelly, 73, Irish Army officer.
Carol Shields, 68, Canadian author.
Reetika Vazirani, 40, Indian-American prize-winning poet and educator.

17
Pat Fillingham, 89, English test pilot for the de Havilland company.
Ferenc Gömbös, 59, Hungarian politician, car accident.
Dr. David Kelly, 59, British scientist and weapons expert, suicide.
Rosalyn Tureck, 89, American pianist and harpsichordist.
Walter Zapp, 97, Baltic German inventor (Minox subminiature camera).

18
Jane Barbe, 74, American voice actress (phone company "Time Lady") and singer, cancer.
Luther L. Bohanon, 100, American judge (U.S. Dist. Judge of the U.S. Dist. Court of Eastern, Northern, Western Districts of Oklahoma).
Marc Camoletti, 79, French playwright.
Norman Rasmussen, 75, American physicist.
Brad Rone, 35, American boxer, injuries sustained in boxing.

19
Bill Bright, 81, American evangelical Christian and founder of Campus Crusade for Christ.
Elena Caffarena, 100, Chilean lawyer and politician.
Pierre Graber, 94, Swiss politician and member of the Swiss Federal Council (1970–1978).
Harold G. Featherstone, 80, American politician, member of the Florida House of Representatives (1967–1972).
Vic Vargas, 64, Filipino actor.
Jessica Grace Wing, 31, American theatrical composer and filmmaker.

20
Lauri Aus, 32, Estonian Olympic racing cyclist (1992, 1996, 2000, 2000), struck on bicycle by drunk driver.
Nicolas Freeling, 76, British crime writer.
Elliot Norton, 100, American Boston-based theater critic, "The Dean of American Theatre Critics".
Ángel Felicísimo Rojas, 93, Ecuadorian writer.
William Woolfolk, 86, American writer, wrote novels, non-fiction, television scripts, comic books.

21
Walter M. "Matt" Jefferies, 81, American art director (Star Trek series); designer of the Starship Enterprise.
John Davies, 65, New Zealand olympian (track) and president of the New Zealand Olympic Committee.
Tim Hemensley, 31, Australian singer & bass guitarist, heroin overdose.

22
Arthur W. Adamson, 83, American chemist, made contributions to inorganic photochemistry.
Norma Elaine Brown, 77, American U.S. Air Force major general.
Hamer H. Budge, 92, American politician (16th Chairman of the SEC, U.S. Representative for Idaho's 2nd congressional district).
Uday Hussein, 39, Iraqi politician and eldest son of Saddam Hussein, killed by US troops.
Qusay Hussein, 37, Iraqi politician and second son of Saddam Hussein, killed by US troops.
Norman Lewis, 95, British travel writer.
Serge Silberman, 86, French film producer.
Richard L. Walker, 81, American diplomat (U.S. Ambassador to South Korea) and professor.

23
Sheila Bromley, 91 or 95, American television and film actress (Westward Ho, Lawless Range, Perry Mason).
Juan Delis, 75, Cuban baseball player (Washington Senators).
Speedy Thomas, 56, American football player.
Florence Vale, 94, Canadian visual artist.
Grady Wilson, 80, American baseball player (Pittsburgh Pirates).

24
James Alesia, 89, American judge (U.S. District Judge of the U.S. District Court for the Northern District of Illinois).
Henri Attal, 67, French actor.
Dame Ella Campbell, 92, New Zealand botanist.
Božidar Drenovac, 81, Serbian football player and manager.
Heinz Knobloch, 77, German writer and journalist.
Dan Smoot, 89, American FBI agent and political activist.

25
Ludwig Bölkow, 91, German aeronautical engineer, designed the world's first jet fighter, Nazi Germany's Me262.
Erik Brann, 52, American Iron Butterfly guitarist.
Ken Ellis, 75, Welsh footballer.
Norm McRae, 55, American baseball player (Detroit Tigers).
Thomas Savage (novelist), 88, American novelist.
John Schlesinger, 77, English film director (Midnight Cowboy, Marathon Man, Sunday Bloody Sunday).

26
William Dargie, 91, Australian painter.
Robert Favart, 92, French actor.
Richard Wayne Dirksen, 82, American composer and organist-choirmaster Washington National Cathedral.
John Higham, 82, American historian.
Harold C. Schonberg, 87, American music critic and journalist.

27
Lajos von Sipeki-von Balás, 89, Hungarian Olympic modern pentathlete (modern pentathlon at the 1936 Summer Olympics).
Vance Hartke, 84, American politician (United States Senator from Indiana from 1959 to 1977).
Henning Holck-Larsen, 96, Danish engineer and entrepreneur.
Bob Hope, 100, British-born American comedian and actor (series of seven "Road" musical comedy movies with Bing Crosby), pneumonia.
Rinty Monahan, 75, American baseball player (Philadelphia Athletics).
Benjamin Munson, 87, American physician.

28
Gladys Edgerly Bates, 107, American sculptor, member of the Philadelphia Ten, founding member of the Mystic Museum of Art.
Emily Bavar, 88, American journalist, broke the story that Walt Disney was buying land near Orlando for Disney World.
Aaron Bell, 82, American jazz bassist, composer and teacher, bassist for Duke Ellington.
True Eames Boardman, 93, American actor and scriptwriter (Gunsmoke, Perry Mason, The Virginian, Bonanza).
Adrian Burk, 75, American professional football player (Baylor, Baltimore Colts, Philadelphia Eagles).
Valerie, Lady Goulding, 84, Irish Senator & disability rights campaigner.
Greg Guidry, 49, American singer-songwriter, suicide.
Noite Ilustrada, 75, Brazilian singer-songwriter and guitarist.
Samuel Oschin, 89, Los Angeles entrepreneur and philanthropist.

29
E.B. Cox, 89, Canadian sculptor.
Luther Henderson, 84, American arranger, composer,  and pianist.
Tex McCrary, 92, American journalist and public relations specialist.
Jim Pruett, 85, American baseball player (Philadelphia Athletics).
Foday Sankoh, 65, Sierra Leonean rebel leader, complications following a stroke.
Sir Gerard Vaughan, 80, British psychiatrist and politician.
Johnny Walker, 82, Indian comic actor, appeared in more than 300 films.

30
Howard Armstrong, 94, American string band fiddler and mandolinist and country blues musician.
Will Atkinson, 95, English shepherd and musician, known for playing the accordion and harmonica.
Fred Cherry, 77, American activist.
Gene Hasson, 88, American baseball player (Philadelphia Athletics).
Steve Hislop, 41, Scottish motorcycle racer, helicopter accident.
Mendel L. Peterson, 85, American archeologist and former curator at the Smithsonian Institution.
Sam Phillips, 80, American record producer.

31
Edward P. Alexander, 96, American historian and author, an authority on museums, heart ailment.
Bigode, 81, Brazilian footballer, respiratory problems.
Guido Crepax, 70, Italian comics artist.
Cyril Foray, 69, Sierra Leonean educator, politician, diplomat and historian.
Patricia Goldman-Rakic, 66, American professor neuroscience, neurology, psychiatry and psychology, struck by a car.
Sardar Muhammad Ibrahim Khan, 88, Pakistani politician, first President of Azad Kashmir.
Vernon Prins, 79, Sri Lankan cricketer.
Fergie Semple, 81, British Army officer.
Roland Svensson, 93, Swedish painter, writer, and artist.

References 

2003-07
 07